Lonnie Johnson may refer to:

 Lonnie Johnson (musician) (1899–1970), American blues and jazz singer, guitarist, and songwriter
 Lonnie Johnson (inventor) (born 1949), American inventor of the Super Soaker
 Lonnie Johnson (American football) (born 1971), former American football player
 Lonnie Johnson Jr., American football player
 Lon Johnson (Lonnie Barton Johnson), American politician